The 1943 NCAA Track and Field Championships were contested at the 22nd annual NCAA-hosted track meet to determine the team and individual national champions of men's collegiate track and field events in the United States. This year's events were held at Dyche Stadium at Northwestern University in Evanston, Illinois.

USC captured their twelfth overall, as well as ninth consecutive, team championship.

Team Result
Note: Top 10 finishers only

See also
 NCAA Men's Outdoor Track and Field Championship
 1942 NCAA Men's Cross Country Championships

References

NCAA Men's Outdoor Track and Field Championship
NCAA Track and Field Championships
NCAA
NCAA Track and Field Championships